Hennadiy Olehovych Korban (born May 24, 1970) is a Ukrainian businessman and politician. A patron of the Jewish community in Dnipro, he served as the head of the UKROP party from July 12, 2015 to January 23, 2016.

Biography

Early life and business career
Hennadiy Korban was born on May 24, 1970 in Dnipropetrovsk (now Dnipro) to a Jewish family of Soviet engineers. His parents are also Israeli citizens. Raised in Dnipropetrovsk, he graduated from secondary school No. 21 in 1987 and unsuccessfully attempted to enrol at the faculty of philosophy at a university in Rostov-on-Don. He later returned to Dnipropetrovsk and entered the National Mining University of Ukraine, but shortly suspended his studies as he was called up for military service in the Soviet Armed Forces. He served as a private in the Guards Aviation Regiment from 1988 to 1990.

Following his discharge from the army, Korban worked as a broker on the Moscow Stock Exchange from 1990 to 1991, before founding a brokerage office in 1992. In 1994, Korban founded a company, Slavutych Capital, and served as the chairman of its Supervisory Board from 2001 until it was later abolished. In 1997, he graduated from the National Mining University of Ukraine as an "economist". From 2001 to 2010, he was a chairman of the Supervisory Board of Southern Mining. In 2005, Korban became a member of the Supervisory Board of Ukrainian oil and gas producer company Ukrnafta. In 2009, he became a member of the Supervisory Board of the company Ukrtatnafta, and resigned from both boards in 2011.

In September 2013, Korban-owned company Budinvest signed a letter of intent with international hotel operator InterContinental Hotels Group on the development of two brands in Kyiv. The company was to manage the brands, with the investment in the construction valued at US$30–40 million. In October 2013, Korban financed the construction of Beit Alon Ganey Korban, a kindergarten and children's sports complex in Kryvyi Rih.

Political career
Korban served as deputy governor of Dnipropetrovsk Oblast from 2 March 2014 to 24 March 2015. He held the post under former governor Ihor Kolomoyskyi, whose tenure ran between the same dates. On September 9, 2015, Korban became the head of the UKROP political council.

Korban took part in the 26 July 2015 parliamentary by-election in constituency 205 located in Chernihiv. With 14.76% of the vote, he finished second behind Serhiy Berezenko of Petro Poroshenko Bloc, who won with 35.90% of the vote.  During the run-up to these elections, Korban and Berezenko were repeatedly accused of bribing voters and using black PR among other violations of electoral legislation. Korban was also the UKROP mayoral candidate in the October 2015 Kyiv local elections, but did not make it to the second round of the mayoral election.

On 31 October 2015, Korban was arrested. Four charges were brought against him, including a charge accusing him of embezzling money from the National Defence Foundation, which he financed. An attempt to impose a pre-trial restraint was made by three judicial authorities, including the Chernihiv District Court and the Pechersk District Court of Kyiv, but failed due to a lack of evidence. In November 2015, he was placed under house arrest for two months.

From December 24 to December 27, 2015, according to a March 2016 report from the United Nations High Commissioner for Human Rights, Korban was "forced to several procedural checks" despite having had heart surgery, after which he was "eventually forcefully transferred to court" for a hearing that "lasted for more than 24 hours and was marked by numerous violations of due process rights." During the trial, army veteran Valentyn Manko gave testimony against Korban, which was later found to be part of a scheme to provide false testimony and ensure a guilty verdict. In exchange for his testimony, robbery charges against Manko would be dropped. On December 27, the courtroom was stormed by unknown protesters who clashed with Korban supporters.

On January 23, 2016, while Korban was detained by the Security Service, the UKROP political council dismissed him as chairman of the party. In March 2016, a court granted him permission to travel to Israel for treatment at Tel Aviv Medical Center. On May 7, 2016, after Korban had fulfilled the demands of his political opponents, the court released him from arrest and granted him permission to leave for Israel.

On August 9, 2016, Mykola Chaus, the judge of the Dniprovskyi District Court of Kyiv who ordered the detention of Korban, was caught with a US$150,000 bribe by the National Anti-Corruption Bureau of Ukraine. In September 2017, he was absolved of all charges due to a lack of evidence, while the main directorate of National Police in Dnipropetrovsk Oblast ceased criminal proceedings on his National Defence Foundation embezzlement charges due to a lack of evidence. On 13 December 2017, Korban returned to Ukraine.

On 22 July 2022, it became known that Korban was denied entry into Ukraine because his Ukrainian citizenship had been revoked, along with Ihor Kolomoyskyi, Vadim Rabinovich, and others.

On 12 August 2022, Korban announced that he had pronounced a Pulsa diNura, a Jewish death curse, against Russian President Vladimir Putin.

Art collection
Korban is a collector of modern and contemporary art. His collection includes works of Gustav Klimt, Damien Hirst, Egon Schiele, Alexej von Jawlensky, Tamara de Lempicka, Takashi Murakami, Andreas Gursky, Yayoi Kusama and Banksy, among others.

References

1970 births
Ukrainian Jews
Businesspeople from Dnipro
Politicians from Dnipro
Ukrainian art collectors
Ukrainian philanthropists
Living people
UKROP politicians
Ukrainian prisoners and detainees
Prisoners and detainees of Ukraine
Dnipro Polytechnic alumni
People who lost Ukrainian citizenship